USDF may refer to:

 United States Dressage Federation
 USDF model (United we stand, divided we fall), from econophysics
 Umbutfo Swaziland Defense Force, the Military of Swaziland
 Utah State Defense Force, active during World War II
 United Student Democratic Federation, Indian leftist student association

See also
 "United we stand, divided we fall", a motto